Wen County or Wenxian is a county under the administration of the prefecture-level city of Longnan, in the southeast of Gansu province, China, bordering Sichuan province to the south and west. It has a land area of 4,994 square kilometers, and a population of 241,000 (2019), notably having the largest population of Baima people.

Gecko Gekko wenxianensis is named after Wen County, its type locality.

Administrative divisions
Wen County is divided to 14 towns and 6 townships.
Towns
 Chengguan : county seat
 Bikou
 Shangde
Zhongzhai
 Linjiang
 Qiaotou
 Liping
 Tianchi)
 Baoziba
Shifang
 Shijiba
 Danbao
 Zhongmiao
 Fanba
Townships

 Liujiaping Township()
 Yulei Township()
 Koutouba Township()
 Jianshan Township()
 Sheshu Township()

Former Townships that were merged into others in 2004: 

Ethnic townships
 Tielou Tibetan Ethnic Township()

History 
Wen County has been inhabited since the neolithic era, as evidenced by Majiayao culture sites. The area was later inhabited by the Di people. Throughout the centuries, the area was ruled by many different dynasties and kingdoms.

As a result of the 2008 Sichuan earthquake, 93% of households in Wen County had their homes damaged or collapsed. The main road to access the county, China National Highway 212, was also blocked in both directions.

Economy
Tea, Codonopsis pilosula, Sichuan pepper, walnuts and olive oil are the main agricultural produce of the region.

Two reservoirs (Bikou Reservoir and Miaojiaba Reservoir) have been constructed in the Bailong River. The reservoirs serve to provide hydroelectricity, aquaculture, flood control, irrigation and for tourism development. The county holds one fifth of total exploitable hydropower resources of Gansu. Wenxian is also rich in metal deposits, most notably the Yangshan gold mine is Asia's largest Carlin–type gold deposit.

Geography 
Major rivers in Wen County are the Bailong River, Baishui River, Baima River and Rangshui River.

Climate

Transport
China National Highway 212
G8513 Pingliang–Mianyang Expressway (under construction)

Notes and references

County-level divisions of Gansu
Longnan